Don't Get It Twisted may refer to:

Music

Albums 
 Don't Get It Twisted, the sixth studio album from American rapper, Mr. Capone-E

Songs 
 "Don't Get It Twisted", a song by Gwen Stefani from her 2006 studio album, The Sweet Escape
 "Don't Get It Twisted", a song by Mr. Capone-E from his 2006 studio album, Don't Get It Twisted